Hart Creek is a stream in the U.S. state of Montana. It is a tributary to the Spotted Bear River.

Hart Creek was named after Evert Hart, who built several cabins in the 1920s.

References

Rivers of Montana
Rivers of Flathead County, Montana